Party Queen is the thirteenth full-length studio album by Japanese singer-songwriter Ayumi Hamasaki. The album was released digitally on March 14, 2012 and physically on March 21, 2012 through Avex Trax. Primarily a pop album, Party Queen is made up mostly of dance songs and ballads. As with all of Hamasaki's albums, she wrote all of the lyrics. Composition was handled by a team of composers, as with many of her albums. Party Queen featured music videos and songs recorded in London and was her second album to do so.

Party Queen became Hamasaki's first album to feature no physical singles; however, "How Beautiful You Are" was released digitally as the album's lead single. As it lacked a physical release, "How Beautiful You Are" was ineligible to chart on the Oricon singles chart, but it did chart at number fifty-two on Billboard's Japan Hot 100, and number three on the RIAJ Digital Track Chart. The song was certified Gold by the Recording Industry Association of Japan for digital sales exceeding 100,000.

Party Queen received mixed reviews from music critics. Commercially, the album became her second to miss the Oricon's top position, debuting at number two in Japan with first-week sales of 97,691 copies, the lowest of her career at that time. It sold around 150,000 copies in Japan by the end of its chart run and received Gold certification.

Release
Party Queen was released in 5 different formats: CD only version; CD+DVD version; CD+2DVD version with the second DVD being Ayumi Hamasaki Countdown Live 2011-2012: Hotel Love Songs; a special limited box set containing CD+4DVD with Ayumi Hamasaki Countdown Live 2011-2012: Hotel Love Songs, Ayumi Hamasaki Power of Music 2011 A: Limited Edition, 2 half-pint glasses and 2 cork coasters; another similar special box set containing CD+2DVD+Blu-ray, Blu-ray being Ayumi Hamasaki Power of Music 2011 A: Limited Edition.

Only 2 songs had commercial endorsements prior to the album release: "Party Queen" was used as commercial song for Peach John and "How Beautiful You Are" was the theme song for drama show "Saigokara Nibanme no Koi". And the promotional music video for the single notably featured an appearance by late gay pornographic actor Koh Masaki and his boyfriend.

To promote Party Queen after its release, Hamasaki attracted around 3,000 fans for her "Public Recording Session Event" at FM Osaka, which was held at Abeno Market Park Ceus Mall on March 27. After that, Hamasaki did Yahoo GyaO's live talk with Joshinavi.

Track listing

Notes

  denotes strings arrangement.

Release history

Charts and certifications

Charts

Certifications

References

2012 albums
Ayumi Hamasaki albums
Japanese-language albums